A grimalkin, also known as a greymalkin, is an archaic term for a cat. The term stems from "grey" (the colour) plus "malkin", an archaic term with several meanings (a low class woman, a weakling, a mop, or a name) derived from a hypocoristic form of the female name Maud. Scottish legend makes reference to the grimalkin as a faery cat that dwells in the highlands.

During the early modern period, the name grimalkinand cats in generalbecame associated with the devil and witchcraft. Women tried as witches in the 16th, 17th and 18th centuries were often accused of having a familiar, frequently a grimalkin.

Uses in fiction
Beware the Cat was published in 1570 by William Baldwin. The novel is a story of talking cats, and part of it relates the story of the Grimalkin's death. According to the editors of a modern edition, the story, and thus the name, originates with Baldwin in terms of being the earliest example known in print. It is also spelled Grimmalkin or Grimolochin.

Grimalkin is the name of the spacekat alien in the SwatKatz tv show S2E3

A cat named Grimalkin in William Shakespeare's 1606 play Macbeth helped the three witches look into Macbeth's future.

A grimalkin appears in chapter 18 of The House of the Seven Gables by Nathaniel Hawthorne. The narrator questions if it's a cat looking at a mouse or the devil looking for a soul, in this case that of Judge Pyncheon.

A grimalkin is also mentioned in Emily Bronte's Wuthering Heights, who briefly sits on a bench next to Mr. Lockwood before being removed hastily by Joseph.

A cat named Grimalkin appears in Shirley Jackson's short story "The Man in the Woods".  It is soon ousted in a brief catfight by the new, unnamed black cat who has just arrived in the heels of the young protagonist Christopher.  The new cat assumes the name of Grimalkin.

A grimalkin is mentioned in the Episode "The Joke's on Catwoman" (Episode 17 of Season 3) of the 1960's Batman TV Series.

Grimalkin is a character in The Dresden Files by Jim Butcher. A malk, cat-like faerie acting as a servant to Mab. She uses him as an interpreter, with Grimalkin speaking to other people in her stead while she remains silent. He first appears in Summer Knight.

Grimalkin is the most powerful witch assassin in the popular young adult series The Spook's Apprentice by Joseph Delaney. She is depicted as a cruel torturer who uses a large pair of scissors to take the thumb bones of her enemies. Her main role is as a close ally and mentor of the main character, Thomas Ward.

A faery cat named Grimalkin appears in Julie Kagawa'''s book series The Iron Fey Series. He has similarities to the Cheshire cat from Alice in WonderlandThe Grimalkin are an anthropomorphic feline race in the Ni No Kuni franchise.

In Wicked (Maguire novel), the main character Elphaba has a pet cat named Grimalkin while staying in the Emerald City.

A cat named Grimalkin is a companion to Sham and Agba in Marguerite Henry's Newbery Medal children's novel King of the Wind.

A cat named Grimalkin is mentioned as a deceased former companion to Elaine in Anna Biller's 2016 film The Love Witch.

A cat identified as a "Grey Malkin" (as of an exotic cat breed) is the eponymous subject of the serial story The Riddle of the Gray Malkin'', starting with Part 1 in Issue #1899  (August, 2021) of the Australian published edition of The Phantom comic series.

A cat familiar named “Grimalkin”  is the watch cat of Dr. Julian Karswell in the 1957 film Curse of the Demon directed by Jacques Tourneur.

Grimalkin is the name of a mysterious black cat in the game Cat Cafe Manager.

See also
 Black cat
 Kellas cat
 Cat-sìth

References

External links

Fictional cats
European witchcraft
Cat folklore